The Florida Channel is a government-access television network operated by Florida State University's WFSU-TV and the Florida State Legislature. The channel is currently carried by 46 cable TV systems throughout the State of Florida either on a part-time or full-time basis as well as through up to 18 live Internet streams and via satellite. The station operates 24 hours a day though its normal broadcast schedule starts at 6:00 a.m. ET and ends at 6:00 p.m. ET with the day's programming repeated in a loop throughout the night. The Florida Channel also airs on the digital subchannels of most Florida PBS member stations and on some public independent and local cable-only stations.

When the state legislature is in session, live gavel-to-gavel coverage of the Florida Senate and the Florida House of Representatives is carried until the end of legislative business and is then usually followed by Capitol Update at 5:30 p.m. ET, which provides comprehensive coverage of each day's most significant legislative events.

When the legislature is not in session, other live gavel-to-gavel programming is carried, including the Florida Supreme Court, the meeting of the governor and cabinet and the Florida Public Service Commission meetings. When there is no live gavel-to-gavel meetings, other local or statewide public affairs programming is carried.

The Florida Channel's offices and studios are located on the 9th floor of the Capitol Building in Tallahassee.

Current affiliates
The following is a list of current affiliates of the Florida Channel which includes "over-the-air" and local and systemwide cable networks in addition to the live stream available on their website and using the Roku streaming device.

Controversy
In June 2011, it was revealed that the Florida Channel would receive $1.8 million for continued operation of the network, as part of the $2.8 million in funding that WFSU will receive. This is despite the $4.8 million of funding to other public radio and television stations vetoed by Governor Rick Scott in May 2011.

References

External links 
 

Television stations in Tallahassee, Florida
Commercial-free television networks
Television networks in the United States
Florida State University
Florida Legislature
Legislature broadcasters in the United States